The Asante Traditional Buildings are a collection of 10 traditionally built buildings from the time of the Ashanti Empire in the area near Kumasi. These buildings served as fetish houses and shrines during the 18th and 19th centuries,during the golden age of the Asante Kingdom. When the kingdom fell during the British occupation of the area from 1806 to 1901, most Asante buildings of the period were destroyed during the era. Among other buildings, the royal mausoleum was destroyed by Robert Baden-Powell in 1895. The 10 remaining buildings are the last remains of the history and culture of the Asante people and were inscribed on the UNESCO World Heritage List in 1980.  

The buildings were described as "home of men and gods". The houses are arranged around courtyards, and are built of timber, bamboo and mud plaster. The walls of the buildings are covered in bas-reliefs, with spiral and arabesque forms and representations of animals, birds and plants. These reliefs consist of traditional Adinkra symbols, having unique symbolic meanings associated with Asante culture and were passed down over generations. 

The traditional religion is still practiced at the shrines, which is the reason for their survival and maintenance. However, because they were built out of mud and straw, the Asante buildings are vulnerable to natural fluctuations. There is therefore a need for the preservation of the buildings.

References 

 Michael Swithenbank. Ahanti fetish houses. Accra Ghana Univ Press, 1969
 About Ghana: World Heritage Sites
 conservation practice in Ghana, a case study: the fetish house at Asawasi (Ashanti) (article, pdf)

World Heritage Sites in Ghana
Ashanti Region
Ashanti Empire